Yelena Skulskaya (born 8 August 1950) is an Estonian journalist, translator and writer who mainly writes in the Russian language.

She was born in Tallinn. In 1974 she graduated from Tartu State University in Russian philology.

1974–1997 she worked as a cultural editor, critic and reporter at the newspaper Estonija. 1996–2008 she worked at Russian Theatre.

Since 1991 she is a member of Estonian Writers' Union.

In 2011 she was awarded with Order of the White Star, IV class.

References

Living people
1950 births
Estonian journalists
Estonian women short story writers
Estonian translators
Estonian people of Russian descent
University of Tartu alumni
Recipients of the Order of the White Star, 4th Class
People from Tallinn